Joe Leeming (born 1936), is a male former boxer who competed for England.

Boxing career
He represented England in the -81 kg division at the 1958 British Empire and Commonwealth Games in Cardiff, Wales.

He trained at Rugby Corinthians Boxing Club and won the Amateur Boxing Association 1958 light heavyweight title .

He made his professional debut on 7 July 1962  and fought in 11 fights until 1963.

References

1936 births
English male boxers
Boxers at the 1958 British Empire and Commonwealth Games
Living people
Light-heavyweight boxers
Commonwealth Games competitors for England